The many-colored rush tyrant or many-coloured rush tyrant (Tachuris rubrigastra) is a small passerine bird of South America belonging to the tyrant flycatcher family, Tyrannidae. It is the only member of the genus Tachuris and is sometimes placed in a separate monotypic family. It inhabits marshland and reedbeds around lakes and rivers. It is particularly associated with stands of Scirpus. The nest is built among plant stems.

Taxonomy and systematics
A 2013 DNA-based study of South American suboscines found that the many-colored rush tyrant belonged to an isolated lineage that had been separated from other suboscines for around 25 million years. The authors proposed that it would be better placed in its own monotypic family Tachurididae. It was subsequently suggested that the name should be Tachurisidae. The placement in a separate family was followed by Edward Dickinson and Leslie Christidis in the fourth edition of the Howard and Moore Complete Checklist of the Birds of the World, but has not yet been adopted by other authorities.

Four subspecies are recognised. The nominate T. r. rubrigastra is the most widespread, occurring from south-east Brazil to southern Argentina and central Chile, T. r. alticola is found in the Andes of south-east Peru, west Bolivia and north-west Argentina, T. r. libertatis is found in coastal Peru while T. r. loaensis is restricted to Antofagasta Region in northern Chile.

Description

The many-colored rush tyrant is a small bird,  in length. As the bird's name suggests, the plumage is very colourful. The back and rump are green while the underparts are yellow apart from the white throat, black breastband and red undertail-coverts. The face is dark blue-grey, there is a yellow stripe over the eye and the crown is dark with a red patch that is often concealed. The wings and tail are dark with a white wingbar and white outer tail-feathers. Females are duller than the males.

References

External links 

Xeno-canto: audio recordings of the many-colored rush tyrant (Tachuris rubrigastra)
Many-coloured rush tyrant in IBC (Internet Bird Collection).

many-colored rush tyrant
Birds of the Puna grassland
Birds of Argentina
Birds of Chile
Birds of Peru
Birds of Uruguay
many-colored rush tyrant
Taxa named by Louis Jean Pierre Vieillot